Mats Dan Erling Corneliusson (born 2 October 1961) is a Swedish former professional footballer who played as a striker. He represented IFK Göteborg, VfB Stuttgart, Como, FC Wettingen, Malmö FF, Qviding FF, and Karlstad BK during a career that spanned between 1978 and 1995. A full international between 1982 and 1990, he won 22 caps and scored 12 goals for the Sweden national team.

Club career
Corneliusson is best remembered for his time with IFK Göteborg with which he won the UEFA Cup and was the 1982 Allsvenskan top scorer. He also represented VfB Stuttgart, with which he became the 1983–84 Bundesliga champion, Como, FC Wettingen, Malmö FF, Qviding FF, and Karlstad BK between 1978 and 1995.

International career 
A full international between 1982 and 1990, Corneliusson won 22 caps and scored 12 goals for the Sweden national team. He also represented the Sweden U17, U19, and U21 teams between 1978 and 1982.

Career statistics

International 

 Scores and results list Sweden's goal tally first, score column indicates score after each Corneliusson goal.

Honours

IFK Göteborg
UEFA Cup: 1981–82
Swedish Champion: 1982, 1983
Svenska Cupen: 1978–79, 1981–82, 1982–83

VfB Stuttgart
Bundesliga: 1983–84
Individual

 Allsvenskan top scorer: 1982

References

External links
 
 

1961 births
Living people
People from Trollhättan
Swedish footballers
Sweden international footballers
IFK Göteborg players
Malmö FF players
Como 1907 players
VfB Stuttgart players
Bundesliga players
Serie A players
Allsvenskan players
Swedish expatriate footballers
Expatriate footballers in Germany
Expatriate footballers in Italy
Swedish expatriate sportspeople in Germany
Swedish expatriate sportspeople in Italy
Association football forwards
UEFA Cup winning players
Sportspeople from Västra Götaland County